Peter Andrew Jack (born 26 September 1980) a Scottish former cricketer.

Jack was born in August 1980 at Bellshill, Lanarkshire. Having represented Scotland in age-group cricket, Jack made a single appearance for the senior Scotland team in a List A one-day match against the Netherlands at Harare in the 2000 ICC Six Nations Challenge. He did not play for Scotland again, but did continue to play club cricket for the West of Scotland and Prestwick until 2004. By 2012, Jack had given up playing cricket a number of years prior, with Neil Drysdale of CricketEurope suggesting his early introduction to the senior Scottish side had ruined him.

References

External links
 

1980 births
Living people
Sportspeople from Bellshill
Scottish cricketers